Henry Dobson (1841–1918) was an Australian politician.

Henry Dobson may also refer to:

Henry Raeburn Dobson (1901–1985), portrait painter
Henry Austin Dobson (1840–1921), English poet and essayist
Henry Dobson (House)
Henry John Dobson (1858–1928), Scottish artist

Fiction
List of House characters#Unsuccessful applicants for fellowship